The Moderate Current Coalition was an electoral alliance of Egyptian political parties, formed after the Egyptian parliamentary elections that occurred in 2011 and 2012.

Formerly affiliated parties 
 Wasat Party 
 Egyptian Current Party 
 Strong Egypt 
 Civilization Party 
 Justice Party 
 April 6 Youth Movement 
 Masrina movement

References 

Defunct political party alliances in Egypt
Islamism in Egypt
Islamic political parties in Egypt